Alexandre Pasche (born 31 May 1991) is a Swiss professional footballer, who plays as a midfielder for Neuchâtel Xamax.

Career
Pasche played for Lausanne-Sport, his local club, from 2002 to 2009, when he moved on to Young Boys. He failed to make an impact at Young Boys, and was sent back to Lausanne-Sport on loan for the 2010–11 and 2011–12 seasons. On 20 June 2012, it was announced that Pasche had signed a three-year contract with Servette although he was still on loan from Young Boys.

He represented Switzerland at the 2008 UEFA European Under-17 Football Championship and 2009 UEFA European Under-19 Football Championship.

References

External links
 
 

1991 births
Living people
Swiss men's footballers
Association football midfielders
Switzerland youth international footballers
Swiss Super League players
FC Lausanne-Sport players
Servette FC players
BSC Young Boys players
Neuchâtel Xamax FCS players
Sportspeople from Lausanne